This is a list of poisonous flowers.

 Aconitum
 Adonis
 Anthurium
 Aquilegia
 Arnica montana
 Asclepias 
 Azalea
 Belladonna
 Bloodflower
 Bloodroot
 Brugmansia
 Buttercups
 Blue cohosh
 Calla lily
 Caladium
 Century plant
 Cicuta
 Clematis
 Crown vetch
 Colchicum
 Datura
 Delphinium
 Digitalis
 Dogbane
 Duranta erecta
 Euphorbia
 Frangipani
 Gloriosa lily
 Goldenseal
 Grevillea
 Hellebore
 Henbane
 Hyacinth
 Horse nettle
 Horse-chestnut
 Hydrangea
 Iris
 Laceflower
 Lamprocapnos spectabilis
 Lantana
 Lily of the valley
 Lobelia
 Lycoris radiata
 Lords and ladies
 Maikoa
 Moleplant
 Monkshood
 Mountain laurel
 Nightshade
 Oleander

 Philodendron
 Pittosporum
 Poison hemlock
 Pokeweed
 Pulsatilla
 Ranunculus
 Rhododendron
 Scotch broom
 Stramonium
 Sweetpea
 Toloache
 Wisteria
 Yellow bell
 Yellow jessamine

Lists of plants
Lists of flowers
Gardening lists
Toxicology